The Captain of the King's Bodyguard of the Yeomen of the Guard is a UK Government post usually held by the Government Deputy Chief Whip in the House of Lords. The present Captain is The 9th Earl of Courtown, who was appointed to the position in the May ministry in July 2016.

1485–present

15th century
1485: John de Vere, 13th Earl of Oxford
1486–1509: Sir Charles Somerset (created Baron Herbert 26 November 1506)

16th century
1509: Sir Thomas Darcy
1509: Sir Henry Marney
1512: Sir Henry Guildford
1513: Sir John Gage
1516: Sir Henry Marney
1530: Sir William Kingston
1539: Sir Anthony Wingfield
1550: Sir Thomas Darcy (created Baron Darcy of Chiche 5 April 1551)
1551: Sir John Gates
1553: Sir Henry Jerningham
1557: Sir Henry Bedingfield
1558: Sir Edward Rogers
1558: Sir William St Loe
1566: Sir Francis Knowlys
1572: Sir Christopher Hatton
1586: Sir Henry Goodier
1586: Sir Walter Raleigh
1592: John Best (During Raleigh's imprisonment in the Tower)
1597–1603: Sir Walter Raleigh

17th century
1603: Sir Thomas Erskine (created Lord Dirletoun 8 June 1604 and Viscount Fentoun 18 March 1606)
1617: Henry Rich (created Baron Kensington 5 March 1623 and Earl of Holland 24 September 1624)
1632: George Hay 
1635: The Earl of Morton
1644: The Earl of Norwich
1649: Interregnum
1660: The Earl of Norwich
1662: The Viscount Grandison
1689–1702: Viscount Mandeville (succeeded as 4th Earl of Manchester 16 March 1683)

18th century

1702: Marquess of Hartington
1707: The Viscount Townshend
1711: The Lord Paget (created Earl of Uxbridge 19 October 1714)
1715: The Earl of Derby
1723: Lord Stanhope
1725: The Earl of Leicester
1731: The Earl of Ashburnham
1733: The Earl of Tankerville
1737: The Duke of Manchester
1739: The Earl of Essex
1743: The Lord Berkeley of Stratton
1746: The Viscount Torrington
1747: The Viscount Falmouth
1782: The Duke of Dorset
April 1783: The Earl of Cholmondeley
16 December 1783: The Earl of Aylesford

19th century
1804: Hon. Thomas Pelham (styled Lord Pelham from January 1805)
1804: The Earl of Macclesfield
1 December 1830: The Marquess of Clanricarde
16 July 1834: The Earl of Gosford
29 December 1834: The Earl of Courtown
23 April 1835: The Earl of Gosford
5 August 1835: The Earl of Ilchester
6 July 1841: The Earl of Surrey
8 September 1841: The Marquess of Lothian
15 January 1842: The Earl of Beverley
24 July 1846: The Viscount Falkland
11 February 1848: The Marquess of Donegall
27 February 1852: The Lord de Ros
30 December 1852: The Viscount Sydney
17 March 1858: The Lord de Ros
28 June 1859: The Earl of Ducie
10 July 1866: The Earl Cadogan
22 December 1868: The Duke of St Albans
2 March 1874: The Lord Skelmersdale
3 May 1880: The Lord Monson
27 June 1885: The Viscount Barrington
10 February 1886: The Lord Monson
5 August 1886: The Earl of Kintore
29 January 1889: The Earl of Limerick
25 August 1892: The Lord Kensington
16 July 1895: The Earl of Limerick
26 August 1896: The Earl Waldegrave

20th century

 8 December 1905: The Duke of Manchester
 12 April 1908: The Lord Allendale
 2 October 1911: The Earl of Craven
 9 June 1915: The Lord Suffield
 21 May 1918: The Lord Hylton
 22 January 1924: The Lord Loch
 1 December 1924: The Lord Desborough
 4 June 1929: The Lord Loch

21st century

References
J. Haydn, The Book of Dignities
C. Cook and B. Keith, British Historical Facts 1830–1900
D. Butler and G. Butler, Twentieth Century British Political Facts 1900–2000

Ceremonial officers in the United Kingdom
Lists of government ministers of the United Kingdom
Positions within the British Royal Household